The 2021–22 season was the 53rd season in the existence of Paris FC and the club's fifth consecutive season in the second division of French football. In addition to the domestic league, Paris FC are participating in this season's edition of the Coupe de France. The club was expelled from the domestic cup due to crowd trouble during their round of 64 game against Olympique Lyonnais.

Players

First-team squad

Out on loan

Transfers

In

Out

Pre-season and friendlies

Competitions

Overall record

Ligue 2

League table

Results summary

Results by round

Matches
The league fixtures were announced on 25 June 2021.

Promotion play-offs

Coupe de France

References

Paris FC seasons
Paris